The humorous epithet "Kevin's Gate" (named after the film Heaven's Gate) has been applied to two films by Kevin Costner:
Dances with Wolves
Waterworld

Waterworld also earned another epithet “Fishtar” as a reference to the Hollywood flop “Ishtar” an expensive and underwhelming film that starred Warren Beatty and Dustin Hoffman.